Hunslet railway station is a disused station in Leeds, Yorkshire, England.  The station was opened by the Midland Railway on 1 April 1850 to serve the suburb of Hunslet.

The new station opened on 14 September 1873 with four platforms.

After the relocation the station remained open until it was closed on 13 June 1960.

Pullman fire
Four people were known to be in the carriage and three were evacuated safely however the body of the fourth was found in his compartment of the carriage, the body was identified as Dr John Arthur from Aberdeen. At the inquest held in Leeds the following week it was concluded that the fire had accidentally started due to another passenger's reading lamp setting fire to the furnishings of the carriage and that Dr Arthur died from suffocation while in a narcotic stupor.

References

Disused railway stations in Leeds
Former Midland Railway stations
Railway stations in Great Britain opened in 1850
Railway stations in Great Britain closed in 1960